In the Asian Region for 2015 Rugby World Cup qualifying, Japan took the sole qualification spot, Asia 1 by winning Round 3: 2014 Asian Five Nations, while second placed Hong Kong qualified for the repechage playoff.

The qualification process included the top four levels of the Asian Five Nations tournaments, beginning in 2012.

Format
Asia provided one direct qualifier for the 2015 Rugby World Cup (Asia 1), and one repechage play-off position. The Asian qualification process used the Asian Five Nations, using the top three divisions in the second tier of Asian teams, and the top tier competition Asian Five Nations.

The 2012 Asian Five Nations Divisions 1 through Division 3 were the first stage of qualifying. The winners of Divisions 2 and 3, Thailand and India, faced each other for the right to be promoted to Division 1 in 2013, Thailand winning. The last place team in Division 1, Singapore, was relegated to Division 2. As only teams in the top tier Asian Five Nations and Division 1 in 2013 could qualify for the top tier in 2014, all the remaining teams were therefore eliminated.

The second phase included the top tier of the 2013 Asian Five Nations, as well as Division 1. The winner of Division 1, Sri Lanka, earned promotion to the top tier for 2014, which served as the qualification final. United Arab Emirates finished in last place in the top tier, thus earning them relegation and elimination from the qualification process.

The final phase was the top tier of the 2014 Asian Five Nations. Japan won, thus qualifying for Pool B of the 2015 Rugby World Cup, along with Samoa, Scotland, South Africa, and USA. Hong Kong finished in second place to qualify for the repechage playoff against Uruguay.

Entrants
The 2015 Rugby World Cup qualifying teams that competed for the 2015 Rugby World Cup – Asia qualification. (World rankings, shown in brackets, are those immediately prior to first Asia qualification match on 30 May 2012)

  (62)
  (58)
  (88)
  (28)
  (77)
  (NR)
  (NR)
  (14)
  (36)
  (63)
  (73)
  (55)
  (67)
  (26)
  (46)
  (65)
  (NR)

Qualified nations

2012

2012 Asian Five Nations Division 3
The winner, India, advanced to the Division 2/3 playoff match against Thailand for the right to compete in 2013 Asian Five Nations Division 1.

2012 Asian Five Nations Division 2
The winners, Thailand, advanced to the Division 2/3 playoff match against India for the right to compete in 2013 Asian Five Nations Division 1.

Division 2/3 Promotion
Thailand defeated India for promotion to the 2013 Asian Five Nations Division 1 and to remain in contention for Rugby World Cup qualifying. Thailand therefore advanced in and India was eliminated from the Rugby World Cup Qualification process.

2012 Asian Five Nations Division 1
The top three teams remained in 2015 Rugby World Cup qualifying, with Philippines advancing to the 2013 Asian Five Nations, and Sri Lanka and Chinese Taipei advancing to the 2013 Asian Five Nations Division 1. The last placed team, Singapore, was eliminated from 2015 Rugby World Cup qualifying.

All the games were played in Manila, Philippines at the Rizal Memorial Stadium.

2013

2013 Asian Five Nations Division 1
The tournament was played in Sri Lanka from 31 March to 6 April 2013. The winner of this division and this stage of qualification, Sri Lanka, earned promotion to the main division for 2014, which will be the final stage of Asian Rugby World Cup qualifying. The remaining three teams were eliminated from World Cup qualifying.

2013 Asian Five Nations

The top four teams advanced to the final stage of Rugby World Cup qualifying, while the last placed team, United Arab Emirates, was relegated to Division 1 and eliminated from qualifying for the Rugby World Cup.

2014 Asian Five Nations

The winner the 2014 Asian Five Nations tournament, Japan, qualified for the 2015 Rugby World Cup as Asia 1 in Pool B. The runner-up in the tournament, Hong Kong, advanced to the repechage playoffs to play Uruguay.

References

External links
 Rugby World Cup qualification
 Asian Five Nations

2015
Asia
2012 in Asian rugby union
2013 in Asian rugby union
2014 in Asian rugby union